The 2006 USL Premier Development League season was the 12th PDL season. The season began in April 2006 and ended in August 2006.

Michigan Bucks finished the season as national champions, beating Laredo Heat 2–1 in the PDL Championship game in Laredo, Texas on 12 August 2006.

Carolina Dynamo finished with the best regular season record in the league, winning 14 out of their 16 games, suffering no losses, and finishing with a +29 goal difference. Cape Cod Crusaders finished a very close second, tied with Dynamo on points and goal difference, but having scored two less goals.

Boulder Rapids Reserve striker John Cunliffe and Augusta Fireball forward Frederico Moojen were the league's top scorers, each knocking in 18 goals. Michigan Bucks's Nate Jafta led the league with 18 assists, while Southern California Seahorses keeper Eric Reed enjoyed the best goalkeeping statistics, with a goals-against average of 0.621 per game, and keeping 10 clean sheets in his 15 games.

Changes from 2005

New franchises 
Ten teams joined the league this year, including nine brand new franchises :

Folding 
Four teams left the league prior to the beginning of the season:
Memphis Express - Memphis, Tennessee
Nevada Wonders - Carson City, Nevada
Spokane Shadow - Spokane, Washington
Toledo Slayers - Toledo, Ohio

Standings

Central Conference

Great Lakes Division

Heartland Division

Eastern Conference

Mid Atlantic Division

New England Division

Northeast Division

Southern Conference

Mid South Division

South Atlantic Division

Southeast Division

Western Conference

Northwest Division

Southwest Division

Playoffs

Bracket

Conference semifinals

Conference finals

National semifinals

National final

See also
United Soccer Leagues 2006

External links
2006 Table of Standings

USL League Two seasons
4